Alfa TV is a Bulgarian television channel owned and operated by the political party Ataka. The channel airs primarily social and political programs that reflect the views of the party in a direct manner.

References

External links
 Official site 
 Alfa TV in Facebook

Television in Bulgaria
Television channels and stations established in 2011